Gevorg Sahakyan (born 15 January 1990) is a Polish Greco-Roman wrestler of Armenian origin. He is a two-time bronze medalist at the World Wrestling Championships and a silver medalist at the European Wrestling Championships.

Career 

In 2018, he won one of the bronze medals in the men's Greco-Roman 67 kg event at the World Wrestling Championships held in Budapest, Hungary.

At the 2019 European Wrestling Championships held in Bucharest, Romania, he won the silver medal in the 67 kg event. In the final, he lost against Atakan Yüksel of Turkey. In March 2021, he competed at the European Qualification Tournament in Budapest, Hungary hoping to qualify for the 2020 Summer Olympics in Tokyo, Japan. He did not qualify at this tournament and he also failed to qualify for the Olympics at the World Olympic Qualification Tournament held in Sofia, Bulgaria.

In January 2021, he won the gold medal in the 67 kg event at the Grand Prix Zagreb Open held in Zagreb, Croatia. In June 2021, he won the gold medal in the 72 kg event at the 2021 Wladyslaw Pytlasinski Cup held in Warsaw, Poland.

Achievements

References

External links 
 

Living people
1990 births
Polish people of Armenian descent
Place of birth missing (living people)
Polish male sport wrestlers
World Wrestling Championships medalists
European Wrestling Championships medalists
21st-century Polish people